Caitlin Sargent-Jones (born 14 June 1992) is an Australian sprinter. She competed in the 4 × 400 m relay at the 2016 Olympics.

References

External links 
 
 Caitlin Jones at Athletics Australia

1992 births
Living people
Australian female sprinters
Olympic athletes of Australia
Athletes (track and field) at the 2016 Summer Olympics
Athletes (track and field) at the 2018 Commonwealth Games
Athletes from Brisbane
Commonwealth Games competitors for Australia
Olympic female sprinters
21st-century Australian women
20th-century Australian women